Twellman is a surname. Notable people with the name include:

 Mike Twellman (born 1960), American soccer defender
 Steve Twellman (born 1949, American soccer left back
 Taylor Twellman (born 1980), American soccer forward and analyst
 Tim Twellman (born 1955), American soccer forward